A consensus theory of truth is the process of taking statements to be true simply because people generally agree upon them.

Varieties of consensus

Consensus gentium

An ancient criterion of truth, the consensus gentium (Latin for agreement of the people), states "that which is universal among men carries the weight of truth" (Ferm, 64).  A number of consensus theories of truth are based on variations of this principle.  In some criteria the notion of universal consent is taken strictly, while others qualify the terms of consensus in various ways.  There are versions of consensus theory in which the specific population weighing in on a given question, the proportion of the population required for consent, and the period of time needed to declare consensus vary from the classical norm.

Consensus as a regulative ideal

A descriptive theory is one that tells how things are, while a normative theory tells how things ought to be.  Expressed in practical terms, a normative theory, more properly called a policy, tells agents how they ought to act.  A policy can be an absolute imperative, telling agents how they ought to act in any case, or it can be a contingent directive, telling agents how they ought to act if they want to achieve a particular goal.  A policy is frequently stated in the form of a piece of advice called a heuristic, a maxim, a norm, a rule, a slogan, and so on.  Other names for a policy are a recommendation and a regulative principle.

A regulative ideal can be expressed in the form of a description, but what it describes is an ideal state of affairs, a condition of being that constitutes its aim, end, goal, intention, or objective.  It is not the usual case for the actual case to be the ideal case, or else there would hardly be much call for a policy aimed at achieving an ideal.

Corresponding to the distinction between actual conditions and ideal conditions there is a distinction between actual consensus and ideal consensus.  A theory of truth founded on a notion of actual consensus is a very different thing from a theory of truth founded on a notion of ideal consensus.  Moreover, an ideal consensus may be ideal in several different ways.  The state of consensus may be ideal in its own nature, conceived in the matrix of actual experience by way of intellectual operations like abstraction, extrapolation, and limit formation.  Or the conditions under which the consensus is conceived to be possible may be formulated as idealizations of actual conditions.  A very common type of ideal consensus theory refers to a community that is an idealization of actual communities in one or more respects.

Critiques
It is very difficult to find any philosopher of note who asserts a bare, naive, or pure consensus theory of truth, in other words, a treatment of truth that is based on actual consensus in an actual community without further qualification.  One obvious critique is that not everyone agrees to consensus theory, implying that it may not be true by its own criteria.  Another problem is defining how we know that consensus is achieved without falling prey to an infinite regress. Even if everyone agrees to a particular proposition, we may not know that it is true until everyone agrees that everyone agrees to it. Bare consensus theories are frequent topics of discussion, however, evidently because they serve the function of reference points for the discussion of alternative theories.

If consensus equals truth, then truth can be made by forcing or organizing a consensus, rather than being discovered through experiment or observation, or existing separately from consensus. The principles of mathematics also do not hold under consensus truth because mathematical propositions build on each other. If the consensus declared 2+2=5 it would render the practice of mathematics where 2+2=4 impossible.

See also
 Argumentum ad populum
 Coherentism
 Confirmation holism
 Consensus reality
Philosophy of history
 Truth
 Truth by consensus
 Truthiness
 Wikiality

Related topics

 Belief
 Epistemology
 Information
 Inquiry

 Knowledge
 Pragmatism
 Pragmaticism
 Pragmatic maxim

 Reproducibility
 Scientific method
 Testability
 Verifiability theory of meaning

References
 Ferm, Vergilius (1962), "Consensus Gentium", p. 64 in Runes (1962).
 Haack, Susan (1993), Evidence and Inquiry:  Towards Reconstruction in Epistemology, Blackwell Publishers, Oxford, UK.
 Habermas, Jürgen (1976), "What Is  Universal Pragmatics?", 1st published, "Was heißt Universalpragmatik?", Sprachpragmatik und Philosophie, Karl-Otto Apel (ed.), Suhrkamp Verlag, Frankfurt am Main.  Reprinted, pp. 1–68 in Jürgen Habermas, Communication and the Evolution of Society, Thomas McCarthy (trans.), Beacon Press, Boston, Massachusetts, 1979.
 Habermas, Jürgen (1979), Communication and the Evolution of Society, Thomas McCarthy (trans.), Beacon Press, Boston, Massachusetts.
 Habermas, Jürgen (1990), Moral Consciousness and Communicative Action, Christian Lenhardt and Shierry Weber Nicholsen (trans.), Thomas McCarthy (intro.), MIT Press, Cambridge, Massachusetts.
 Habermas, Jürgen (2003), Truth and Justification, Barbara Fultner (trans.), MIT Press, Cambridge, Massachusetts.
 James, William (1907), Pragmatism, A New Name for Some Old Ways of Thinking, Popular Lectures on Philosophy, Longmans, Green, and Company, New York, New York.
 James, William (1909), The Meaning of Truth, A Sequel to 'Pragmatism''', Longmans, Green, and Company, New York, New York.
 Kant, Immanuel (1800), Introduction to Logic.  Reprinted, Thomas Kingsmill Abbott (trans.), Dennis Sweet (intro.), Barnes and Noble, New York, New York, 2005.
 Kirkham, Richard L. (1992), Theories of Truth:  A Critical Introduction, MIT Press, Cambridge, Massachusetts.
 Rescher, Nicholas (1995), Pluralism:  Against the Demand for Consensus, Oxford University Press, Oxford, UK.
 Runes, Dagobert D. (ed., 1962), Dictionary of Philosophy'', Littlefield, Adams, and Company, Totowa, New Jersey.

Truth
Theories of truth
Consensus